John Cassian, also known as John the Ascetic and John Cassian the Roman (Ioannus Cassianus, or Ioannes Massiliensis;  – ), was a Christian monk and theologian celebrated in both the Western and Eastern churches for his mystical writings. Cassian is noted for his role in bringing the ideas and practices of early Christian monasticism to the medieval West.

Biography
Cassian was born around 360, most likely in the region of Scythia Minor (now Dobruja, a historical region shared today by Romania and Bulgaria),
 although some scholars assume a Gallic origin. The son of wealthy parents, he received a good education: his writings show the influence of Cicero and Persius. He was bilingual in Latin and Greek.

Cassian mentions having a sister in his first work, the Institutes, with whom he corresponded in his monastic life; she may have ended up with him in Marseilles.

As a young adult he traveled to Palestine with an older friend Germanus, with whom he would spend much of the next twenty-five years. There they entered a hermitage near Bethlehem. After remaining in that community for about three years, they journeyed to the desert of Scete in Egypt, which was rent by Christian struggles. There they visited a number of monastic foundations.

Approximately fifteen years later, about 399, Cassian and Germanus faced the Anthropomorphic controversy provoked in letter form by Theophilus, Archbishop of Alexandria. Cassian noted that the majority of the monks received the message of their patriarch "with bitterness", and charged Theophilus with heresy for impugning the plain teaching of scripture. Following an unsuccessful journey to Alexandria to protest the matter, Cassian and Germanus fled with about 300 other Origenist monks. Cassian and Germanus went to Constantinople, where they appealed to the Patriarch of Constantinople, John Chrysostom, for protection. Cassian was ordained a deacon and became a member of the clergy attached to the patriarch while the struggles with the imperial family ensued. When the patriarch was forced into exile from Constantinople in 404, the Latin-speaking Cassian was sent to Rome to plead his cause before Pope Innocent I.

While he was in Rome, Cassian accepted the invitation to found an Egyptian-style monastery in southern Gaul, near Marseilles. He may also have spent time as a priest in Antioch between 404 and 415. In any case, he arrived in Marseilles around 415. His foundation, the Abbey of St Victor, was a complex of monasteries for both men and women, one of the first such institutes in the West, and served as a model for later monastic development.

Cassian's achievements and writings influenced Benedict of Nursia, who incorporated many of the principles into his monastic rule, and recommended to his own monks that they read the works of Cassian. Since Benedict's rule is still followed by Benedictine, Cistercian, and Trappist monks, John Cassian's thought still exercises influence over the spiritual lives of thousands of men and women in the Latin Church.

Cassian died in 435 at Marseille.

Writings
Cassian came very late into writing and did so only when a request was made by one or more important persons.  His sources were the same as those of Evagrius Ponticus, but he added his own ideas, which were arranged in extensive collections. Evagrius was, however, the single most important influence on Cassian's ideas, due to his reverence for the "Origenist" monks (who also relied predominantly on Evagrius) of Nitria, Kellia, and Scetis, three early monastic centres in the desert of the northwestern Nile Delta.

Around 420, at the request of Bishop Castor of Apt in Gallia Narbonensis, Cassian wrote two major spiritual works, the De institutis coenobiorum (Institutes of the Coenobia) and the Conlationes or Collationes patrum in scetica eremo (Conferences of the Desert Fathers). In these, he codified and transmitted the wisdom of the Desert Fathers of Egypt. The Institutes deal with the external organization of monastic communities, while the Conferences deal with "the training of the inner man and the perfection of the heart".

His books were written in Latin, in a simple, direct style. They were swiftly translated into Greek, which indicates the Eastern monks recognized him as one of their own. Some of his works had been translated into Georgian by the 11th century.

The Institutes
The Institutes were meant to help Castor to establish a coenobium following the model of Egypt, in contrast to the existing monastic life in Gaul, which included the work of Martin of Tours. According to Hugh Feiss the Institutes are a counterweight to Sulpicius Severus’ Life of Martin and Dialogues, and are an attempt to put order into a movement Cassian regarded as chaotic. Cassian, who insists on manual work, had a higher opinion of and close ties with the monastery on the Island of Lerins, founded by Honoratus.

In Books 1–4 of Institutions, Cassian discusses clothing, prayer and rules of monastic life. Books 5–12 are rules on morality, specifically addressing the eight vices – gluttony, lust, greed, hubris, wrath, envy, listlessness, and boasting – and what to do to cure these vices. In the Institutions, Cassian discusses a will that is more complex than the will at the heart of the Pelagian message. Willful monks are a contentious problem, and Cassian paid considerable attention to analyzing the will, treating the corrupt will, and chiefly subordinating even the good will for the good of the community and ultimately, the will of God.

Outline of Cassian's Institutes:

The Conferences
The Conferences, dedicated to Pope Leo, to the bishop of Fréjus, and to the monk Helladius, summarize important conversations that Cassian had with elders from the monastery at Scetis about principles of the spiritual and ascetic life.  This book addresses specific problems of spiritual theology and the ascetic life.  It was later read in Benedictine communities after the evening meal, and from the Latin title, Collationes, comes the word collation in the sense of "light meal".

Outline of Cassian's Conferences:

Spirituality
The desert ascetics of Egypt followed a three-step path to mysticism: Purgatio, Illuminatio, and Unitio. These stages correspond to the three ways of later Catholic theology. During the first level, Purgatio (in Greek, Catharsis), young monks struggled through prayer and ascetic practices to gain control of "the flesh"—specifically by purging their gluttony, lust and desire for possessions. This period of purgation, which often took many years, was intended to teach young monks that whatever strength they had to resist these desires (grace) came directly from the Holy Spirit.

At this point, the Illuminatio (theoria in Greek) commenced. During this period the monks practiced the paths to holiness as revealed in the Gospel, identifying strongly with the Christ who taught the Sermon on the Mount (found in Matthew 5–7). Many monks took in visitors and students and tended the poor as much as their resources allowed. Many monks died never having moved past this period. The final stage was the Unitio (theosis in Greek), a period in which the soul of the monk was meant to bond with the Spirit of God in a union often described as the marriage of the Song of Solomon (also called the "Song of Songs" or the "Canticle of Canticles"). To find the solitude and peace that this level of mystical awareness demanded, elderly monks often fled into the deep desert or into remote forests.

His asceticism, while rigorous, was tempered by common sense. Cassian says hospitality should override ascetical routine. Even the most contemplative of anchorites should entertain visitors. Both asceticism and ministry are aspects of the practical life.

In his Conferences, Cassian recommended as "absolutely necessary for possessing the perpetual awareness of God" the formula in Psalm 70 (69) v. 2, Deus, in adiutorium meum intende. Domine, ad adiuvandum me festina ("God, incline unto my aid; O Lord, make haste to help me"), He says of it:

Benedict of Nursia praises Cassian's Conferences in his rule and use of this formula became part of the Liturgy of the Hours in the Western Church, in which all the canonical hours, including the minor hours, start with this versicle, which is omitted only if the hour begins with the Invitatory, the introduction to the first hour said in the day, whether it be the Office of Readings or Morning Prayer. Alphonsus Liguori also cites Cassian's recommendation to use this short prayer continually.

In the West, Cassian's proposition that "the slightest glimmer of goodwill" could be attributed to the human drive was widely regarded as unacceptable in relation to the prosperity of the Augustinianism of the period (Conf. 13.7.1; cf Prosper of Aquitaine Contra Collatorem; Cassiodorus, Institutiones 1.29; Decretum Gelasianum V.7). In his Thirteenth Conference and in writings to the Monks of Lerins, Cassian qualifies this by saying the good will is "stirred" by God: 

Cassian finds the will to be insufficient for spiritual progress, and traces this back to the initial sin of pride. Cassian illustrates advanced cases of the will's pathology in the Institutions, saying these problems began when man "believed himself capable of attaining the glory of the Godhead by his freedom of will and hard work." To this end, Cassian believes the renunciate must conquer his will, overcome it, and even kill it.

In regards to demons, Cassian noted that the earliest coenobites would ensure one monk was reciting a prayer, psalmody, or reading at all times, due to their belief that demons were especially prevalent at night. Cassian promotes David's evil spirit repulsing prayer at Ps. 35: 1–3, for demons actively oppose the virtuous life, and could be warded off with prayer.

Accusations of Semipelagianism

As viewed by the Roman Catholic Church
His third book, On the Incarnation of the Lord, was a defense of orthodox doctrine against the views of Nestorius, and was written at the request of the Archdeacon of Rome, later Pope Leo I. In this book Cassian points out a link between Nestorianism which stresses the humanity of Jesus and Pelagianism which stresses human effort. Later theologians, however, labeled Cassian as "Semipelagian" because he stressed the role of the human will, as opposed to Augustine's stress on the totality of grace, in moving towards salvation.

The ideas expressed by Cassian to which critics have pointed as examples of his alleged Semipelagianism are found in his Conferences, in book 3, the Conference of Abbot Paphnutius; book 5, the Conference of Abbot Serapion; and most especially in book 13, the Third Conference of Abbot Chaeremon.

The view that Cassian propounded Semipelagianism has been disputed. Lauren Pristas, writes: "For Cassian, salvation is, from beginning to end, the effect of God's grace. It is fully divine. Salvation, however, is salvation of a rational creature who has sinned through free choice. Therefore, salvation necessarily includes both free human consent in grace and the gradual rehabilitation in grace of the faculty of free choice. Thus Cassian insists salvation is also fully human. His thought, however, is not Semi-Pelagian, nor do readers who submit to the whole corpus emerge Semi-Pelagians." And Augustine Casiday states that "for Cassian ... although sparks of goodwill may exist (which are not directly caused by God), they are totally inadequate and only direct divine intervention can ensure our spiritual progress".

The Latin Church condemned Semipelagianism in the local Council of Orange (529), but recognizes Cassian himself as a saint. It did not endorse Augustine entirely and, while later Catholic theologians accepted Augustine's authority, they interpreted his views in the light of writers such as Cassian.

As viewed by the Eastern Orthodox Church
Augustine Casiday states that Cassian "baldly asserts that God's grace, not human free will, is responsible for 'everything which pertains to salvation' - even faith." Some other Orthodox, who do not apply the term "Semi-Pelagian" to their theology, criticize the Roman Catholics for allegedly rejecting Cassian, whom they accept as fully orthodox, and for holding, as, in Casiday's interpretation, that everything which pertains to salvation comes from God's grace, and so that even the human consent to God's justifying action is itself an effect of grace, This position of the Roman Catholic Church and of Cassian as interpreted by Casiday is attributed by Eastern Orthodox theologian Georges Florovsky also to the Eastern Orthodox Church, which, he says, "always understood that God initiates, accompanies, and completes everything in the process of salvation", rejecting instead the Calvinist idea of irresistible grace. Neither Cassian nor any of his teachings have ever been directly or indirectly called into question or condemned by Eastern Orthodox, as they are considered a witness to the Orthodox position.

In Cassian's writings
In The Book of Mystical Chapters, a compilation of sayings of the Church Fathers by renowned theologian and early church historian John Anthony McGuckin, Cassian is quoted as saying the following:

Other views
According to some scholars, Cassian is a prominent representative of a monastic movement in southern Gaul which,  ca. 425, gave expression to the soteriological view that much later was called Semipelagianism. This emphasized the role of free will in that the first steps of salvation are in the power of the individual, without the need for divine grace. His thought has been described as a "middle way" between Pelagianism, which taught that the will alone was sufficient to live a sinless life, and the view of Augustine of Hippo, which emphasizes original sin and the absolute need for grace.

For instance, Anglican priest and historian Owen Chadwick stated that Cassian held that man can come to God without the intervention of divine grace first; and the Presbyterian theologian B. B. Warfield called Cassian the leader of the monastics in southern Gaul who asserted that men begin their turning to God and that God assists that beginning.

Influence
The spiritual traditions of Cassian had an immeasurable effect on Western Europe. Many different western spiritualities, from that of St Benedict of Nursia to that of St Ignatius of Loyola, owe their basic ideas to Cassian.

Pope Gregory I's teaching on the seven deadly sins comes from Cassian, as does much of his teaching on compunction and prayer. Philip Neri used to read Cassian to the laity and would frequently use his work as the starting point for his own addresses. He also influenced John Climacus and John of Damascus, as well as Saint Dominic, Francis de Sales, and John Henry Newman.

Cassian's writings stress the role of prayer and personal asceticism in attaining salvation by contrast with Augustine's writings which stress the role of God's justice and grace (predestination) and take a more negative view of human effort. His teaching on overcoming the eight evil tendencies (See Books 5 to 12 of The Institutes) were the inspiration behind the way the Irish monks practised asceticism, as shown in the Irish Penitentials.

The Institutes had a direct influence on organization of monasteries described in the Rule of Saint Benedict; Benedict also recommended that ordered selections of the Conferences be read to monks under his Rule. Moreover, the monastic institutions Cassian inspired kept learning and culture alive during the Early Middle Ages, and were often the only institutions that cared for the sick and poor.

His works are excerpted in the Philokalia (Greek for "love of the beautiful"), the Eastern Orthodox compendium on mystical Christian prayer.

Even modern thinkers have been influenced by Cassian's thinking. Michel Foucault was fascinated by the rigorous way Cassian defined and struggled against the "flesh". Perhaps because of investigations like these, Cassian's thought and writings are enjoying a recent popularity even in non-religious circles.

Veneration

He is a saint of the Eastern Orthodox Churches, with a feast day on 29 February. Because this day occurs only once every four years on leap years, official church calendars often transfer his feast to another date (usually 28 February).

The Roman Catholic Church also ranks him as a saint, with a feast day on 23 July (death anniversary). Like his contemporaries Augustine of Hippo and John Chrysostom, he was never formally canonized, a process that came into use several centuries after his death. Pope Urban V referred to him as sanctus (a saint) and he was included in the Gallican Martyrology He is included also in the Roman Martyrology with a feast-day on 23 July.  In the Irish church, at the beginning of the ninth century, Cassian was commemorated on 25 November, as indicated in the Martyrology of Óengus: "Lasin nEoin Cassian assa érchain corann" (With John Cassian whose crown is very fair).  Like the great majority of recognized saints of the church, he is not one of the saints in the General Roman Calendar, but the Archdiocese of Marseilles and some monastic orders celebrate his memorial on his feast day.

In 2022, John Cassian was officially added to the Episcopal Church liturgical calendar with a feast day on 23 July.

Cassian's relics are kept in an underground chapel in the Monastery of Saint Victor in Marseilles. His head and right hand are in the main church there.

Works
English Translations
 

 
 
French translations

See also
 Libertarianism (metaphysics)

References

Notes

Citations

Sources

Further reading
Rousseau, Philip. "Cassian." In Simon Hornblower and Antony Spawforth, eds. The Oxford Classical Dictionary. Oxford: Oxford UP, 2003. 298.
Harper, James. "John Cassian and Sulpicius Severus," Church History vol. 34 (1965):371-380.
Brown, Peter. The Rise of Western Christendom : Triumph and Diversity, A.D. 200-1000. Oxford: Blackwell Publishing, 2003. pp. 111
Encyclopedia of Religion. ed. Lindsay Jones. Vol. 3. 2nd ed. Detroit: Macmillan Reference USA, 2005. pp. 1447–1448.
New Catholic Encyclopedia. vol. 3. 2nd ed. Detroit:Gale, 2003. pp. 205–207

External links

Online texts
 
Institutes of John Cassian  New Advent
Latin edition of the De Coenobiorum Institutis
Text of the Conferences New Advent
Text of On the Incarnation of the Lord (Against Nestorius)
Collationes patrum XXIV. From the Lessing J. Rosenwald Collection at the Library of Congress. 
 Lewis E 63 Collationes XXIV, incomplete at OPenn
 Lehigh Codex 5 John Cassian. Coliatiosses XXIV at UPenn
 

Others
Plotz, John. "Their Noonday Demons, and Ours", The New York Times Sunday Book Review, 23 December 2011 - Essay on Acedia, Cassian's Views, and modern application
Opera Omnia by Migne Patrologia Latina
Feiss OSB, Hugh. "Cassian and Monasticism", Monastery of the Ascension; Jerome, Idaho 
Venerable John Cassian the Roman Orthodox icon and synaxarion
St. John Cassian Monastery, Constanta, Romania

360 births
435 deaths
4th-century Byzantine monks
4th-century Christian mystics
4th-century Christian saints
4th-century Christian theologians
5th-century Byzantine monks
5th-century Christian mystics
5th-century Christian saints
5th-century Christian theologians
4th-century Gallo-Roman people
5th-century Gallo-Roman people
Ascetics
Byzantine Christian mystics
Byzantine writers
Roman Catholic mystics
Roman Catholic writers
Deacons
Egyptian Christian monks
Founders of Christian monasteries
Gallo-Roman saints
Hesychasts
5th-century Latin writers
People from Dobruja
5th-century Byzantine writers
4th-century Latin writers
Philokalia